Sulzibash (Sülyebaş) is a rural locality (a village) in Azyakovsky Selsoviet, Burayevsky District, Bashkortostan, Russia. The population was 31 as of 2010. There is 1 street.

Geography 
Sulzibash is located 24 km southeast of Burayevo (the district's administrative centre) by road. Novomustafino is the nearest rural locality.

References 

Rural localities in Burayevsky District